Caenoriata is a genus of tephritid  or fruit flies in the family Tephritidae.

Species
Caenoriata pertinax (Bates, 1934)

References

Tephritinae
Tephritidae genera
Diptera of South America